Gungolding is a German village and hamlet (Ortsteil) of the municipality of Walting, in the District of Eichstätt, Bavaria.

Overview
The river Altmühl flows through the center of the village. Gungolding is at least a thousand years old and is located on what was once an important Roman road.

References

External links

Villages in Bavaria
Eichstätt (district)